In computing, romfs (ROM filesystem) is an extremely simple file system lacking many features, intended for burning important files onto an EEPROM.  It is available on Linux, and possibly other Unix-like systems.

It is very useful as an initial ROM holding kernel modules that can be loaded later as needed.  It is very small, code wise.

The description of the filesystem layout is available on LXR  romfs.txt.

Bo Brantén has created a RomFS file system  driver for Windows NT/2k/XP.

Nikolay Aleksandrov has written RomFS image extraction and manipulation tool called romfser. Primarily targeted at the BSD family of operating systems because they lack support for RomFS.

References

Free special-purpose file systems
File systems supported by the Linux kernel